Interstate 265 (I-265) is a  Interstate Highway partially encircling the Louisville metropolitan area. Starting from I-65 in the southern part of Louisville, it runs through Jefferson County, Kentucky, crosses the Ohio River on the Lewis and Clark Bridge into Indiana, meets I-65 for a second time, and then proceeds westbound to terminate at the I-64 interchange.

The entire Kentucky stretch of the road is cosigned with Kentucky Route 841 (KY 841). An additional  stretch of freeway between U.S. Route 31W (US 31W)/US 60/KY 1934 and I-65 in the southern Louisville is solely designated as KY 841. The portion from I-71 to the Ohio River, while designated as I-265 by AASHTO, is only signed as KY 841. The highway is named the Gene Snyder Freeway (originally named the Jefferson Freeway), after the former congressman from Kentucky, and usually called "the Snyder" by locals.

Likewise on the Indiana side, the stretch from I-65 to the bridge, while designated as I-265 is signed as State Route 265 (SR 265). The highway is known as the Lee H. Hamilton Freeway after the former congressman from Indiana. 

I-265 signage for the section from I-71 to the Indiana I-65 interchange has not yet been placed.

Route description

|-
| IN || 
|-
| KY || 
|-
| Total || 
|}

Indiana

I-265 in the US state of Indiana presently runs  from I-64 at the western edge of New Albany to the Lewis and Clark Bridge near Utica. Beginning at its western terminus, the freeway is concurrent with State Road 62 (SR 62) until exit 10.

Kentucky
I-265 in the US state of Kentucky presently runs  from the Lewis and Clark Bridge in northern Louisville to an interchange with I-65 in southern Louisville. The entire freeway is concurrent with KY 841.

The primary factors stem from its low-level grass median which offers little to no protection for crossover incidents. Driver inattention and increased traffic and congestion has led to a decline in the overall level-of-service. Part of the road is currently signed in kilometers, which is unusual in the United States.

Kentucky Route 841

Kentucky Route 841 (KY 841) is a  state highway in the suburbs of Louisville. The route is a partial beltway, encircling Louisville on its southern and eastern sides. Compass direction changes to the north and south of exit 23, the Taylorsville Road interchange. The western terminus of the route is at US 31W and US 60 in the southwest Louisville community of Valley Station, where KY 841 continues to the west as KY 1934 while the northern terminus is at the Lewis and Clark Bridge north of the north of the East End Tunnel. Even though the section between its terminus at KY 1934 and I-65 was built to Interstate Highway standards, it is designated only as KY 841 due to American Association of State Highway and Transportation Officials (AASHTO) numbering rules. The exit numbering for the Kentucky portion of beltway currently starts at the western terminus of KY 841. The KY 841 designation mostly concurrent with I-265 in Kentucky has remained.

History

Originally signed just as KY 841, the Jefferson Freeway was initially constructed in the 1960s in two sections—one between KY 155 (Taylorsville Road) and US 60 (Shelbyville Road) and a second section between KY 1447 (Westport Road) and US 42—as short connectors to the eastern suburban expansion as well as a new Ford plant. By 1970, I-264 had become very congested and was in need of reconstruction and other improvements. I-265 was proposed as an outer beltway to provide pass-through motorists relief from the congestion of I-264. Construction started in the early 1980s and was finished later that decade and signed in 1987.

State Road 265 (SR 265) was what the segment of the highway between I-65 and SR 60 at exit 10 in Indiana was originally known as. It was legally rechristened in June 2019 to I-265 after a new  section of highway that includes the Lewis and Clark Bridge (known as the East End Bridge during planning and construction) fully opened to traffic on December 18, 2016, however the SR 265 signs along the road and the exits still remain and have not been updated to I-265 signage, while the Kentucky portion of the new roadway likewise has not had I-265 signage added as of yet.

East End Bridge 
Negotiations between Indiana and Kentucky to build the bridge had taken place over the preceding 30 years.

In late 2005, members of the Louisville Metro Council proposed a committee to begin planning a western bridge over the Ohio River to link the southwestern end of the highway in Kentucky to Indiana.

On December 18, 2016, SR 265 was extended east of SR 62, which crosses the Ohio River connecting with KY 841, and north of US 42 in Kentucky as part of the Ohio River Bridges Project, creating a bypass around the eastern side of the city of Louisville.

The I-265/I-64 interchange, currently a cloverleaf with no collector–distributor lanes, is being reconstructed as part of the I-Move Kentucky Project with an estimated completion in the autumn of 2023.

Exit list

See also

Roads in Louisville, Kentucky

References

External links

 KentuckyRoads.com: I-265

65-2
65-2
65-2
2
Transportation in Jefferson County, Kentucky
0265
Transportation in Clark County, Indiana
Transportation in Floyd County, Indiana